The Queen's Award for Enterprise: International Trade (Export) (1979) was awarded on 21 April 1979, by Queen Elizabeth II.

Recipients
The following organisations were awarded this year.

 Alenco Flex, Brimsdown, Enfield. Plastics. Received by Vincent Campbell, Deputy Managing Director 1979
 Aquascutum

References

Queen's Award for Enterprise: International Trade (Export)
1979 in the United Kingdom